John Swift (27 June 1790, in Philadelphia – 9 June 1873, in Philadelphia) was an American lawyer and politician and long-time mayor of Philadelphia. He was admitted to the bar in 1810. He was a leader of the Whigs of Philadelphia and served as mayor 1832–1838, 1839–1841, and 1845–1849. In 1840, Swift became the first mayor to be elected by popular election. He is buried at Christ Church Burial Ground.

Personal life 
John Swift was born in Philadelphia on January 21, 1790, his father was Charles Swift, one of the founders of the Pennsylvania Academy of the Fine Arts. Swift graduated from University of Pennsylvania in 1808 with a Bachelor of Arts Degree. Swift married Mary Truxton, daughter of Commodore Thomas Truxton, on March 11, 1808. Swift was admitted to the Pennsylvania Bar five days later on March 16, 1811.

Swift was elected a member of the State in Schuylkill, otherwise known as the Schuylkill Fishing Company on October 2, 1822. His name appears first in the charter granted by the commonwealth to the State in the Schuylkill on April 27, 1838.

Military career 
Swift was Captain of the second company of the Washington Guards during the War of 1812. Post-war Swift became a Colonel.

Mayor of Philadelphia 
Swift served 12 years as a Mayor of Philadelphia over 3 terms. Swift won the first Philadelphia Mayoral election with popular vote on October 15, 1839. The following year, on October 20, 1840, Swift won the first Philadelphia Mayoral election purely decided by Popular vote.

References

External links

1790 births
1873 deaths
American military personnel of the War of 1812
Mayors of Philadelphia
19th-century American politicians